The VIII Air Force Composite Command was a subordinate command of Eighth Air Force.  It was originally responsible for combat training of aircrews arriving from the United States, a mission it continued until near the end of the war, when the air divisions began the training.  Starting in late winter of 1944, the command took over special operations missions, including night leaflet dropping, infiltration of agents behind enemy lines and supplying resistance forces in occupied countries.  As Allied forces advanced across Europe, most of its personnel were used to form provisional disarmament units.  The command was disbanded in October 1948, when the United States Air Force decided it would have no future need for a level of command between major commands and air divisions.

History

Lineage
 Established as 8th Air Force Composite Command
 Activated c. 4 July 1942
 Redesignated VIII Air Force Composite Command on 18 September 1942
 Inactivated c. 31 May 1945
 Disbanded 8 October 1948

Assignments
 Eighth Air Force, c. 4 July 1942
 Eighth Air Force, 22 February 1944
 Ninth Air Force, February 1945 – c. 31 May 1945

Components
 Groups

 1st Combat Crew Replacement Center Group (Bombardment, Heavy, Special), 12 November 1943 – c. 31 May 1945
 2d Combat Crew Replacement Center Group (Bombardment, Heavy, Special), 12 November 1943 – c. 31 May 1945
 3d Combat Crew Replacement Center Group (Bombardment or Fighter, Special), 21 November 1943 – c. 23 September 1944, 10 October 1944 – 1 February 1945 (attached to Air Disarmament Command [Provisional])
 4th Combat Crew Replacement Center Group (Bombardment or Fighter, Special), 21 November 1943 – c. 31 May 1945
 5th Combat Crew Replacement Center Group, 3 November 1943 – c. 31 May 1945
 328th Service Group, 26 February 1944–c. August 1944
 482d Bombardment Group, 14 February – 1 October 1944
 492d Bombardment Group, c. 10 August – 1 October 1944
 495th Fighter Training Group, 26 October – December 1943, February 1944–September 1944
 496th Fighter Training Group, 11 December – December 1943; February – September 1944
 801st Bombardment Group (Provisional) 28 March – 4 August 1944
 2900th Combat Crew Replacement Center Group (Provisional), 16 August – 14 November 1943
 2901st Combat Crew Replacement Center Group (Provisional), 20 August – 12 November 1943
 2902d Combat Crew Replacement Center Group  (Provisional), 23 August – 21 November 1943
 2915th Combat Crew Replacement Center Group (Provisional), 16 August – 12 November 1943

 Squadrons
 36th Bombardment Squadron, 26 February – 1 October 1944 (attached to 328th Service Group, 27 February 1944; 801st Bombardment Group (Provisional), 28 March 1944–4 August 1944)
 406th Bombardment Squadron, 26 February – 1 October 1944 (attached to 328th Service Group, 27 February 1944; 801st Bombardment Group (Provisional), 28 March 1944–4 August 1944)
 788th Bombardment Squadron, 11 May – 10 August 1944 (attached to 801st Bombardment Group (Provisional))
 850th Bombardment Squadron, 11 May – 10 August 1944 (attached to 801st Bombardment Group (Provisional))
 858th Bombardment Squadron, 19 June – 5 August 1944

Stations
 Bolling Field, District of Columbia, c. 4 July 1942
 RAF Long Kesh (Station 232), Northern Ireland, 12 September 1942 – 5 February 1944
 Kirkassock House (Station 231), Northern Ireland, November 1942
 RAF Cheddington (Station 113), England, 22 February 1944
 RAF Watford (Station 341), England, c. 1 October 1944
 Creil Airfield (see :fr:Base aérienne 110 Creil, A-81), France, February 1945
 Luxemburg Luxemburg, c. 30 April 1945–c. 31 May 1945

References

Notes
 Explanatory notes

 Citations

Bibliography

 
 
 
 

08
Military units and formations disestablished in 1948